Fred Lincoln "Link" Wray Jr. (May 2, 1929 – November 5, 2005) was an American guitarist, songwriter, and vocalist who became popular in the late 1950s.

Rolling Stone placed Wray at No. 45 of the 100 greatest guitarists of all time. In 2013 and 2017 he was a nominee for the Rock and Roll Hall of Fame.

Early life
Wray was born on May 2, 1929, in Dunn, North Carolina, to Fred Lincoln Wray, Sr. and Lillian Mae Wray (née Coats), who her son identified as being Shawnee. He recalled living in very harsh conditions during childhood, in mud huts, without electricity or heating, going to school barefoot, barely clothed. He recounted that his family experienced discrimination, including times when they had to hide from the Ku Klux Klan. Wray later said: "The cops, the sheriff, the drugstore owner—they were all Ku Klux Klan. They put the masks on and, if you did something wrong, they'd tie you to a tree and whip you or kill you." They would list themselves as white on census records. Three songs Wray performed during his career were named for Indigenous peoples: "Shawnee", "Apache", and "Comanche."

His two brothers, Vernon (born January 7, 1924 - died March 26, 1979) and Doug (born July 4, 1933 - died April 29, 1984), were his earliest bandmates.

Wray served in the U.S. Army during the Korean War (1950–53). He contracted tuberculosis, which hospitalized him for a year. His stay concluded with the removal of a lung, which doctors predicted would mean he would never be able to sing again.

Career
Building on the distorted electric guitar sound of early records, Wray's first hit was the 1958 instrumental "Rumble". The record was first released on Cadence Records (catalog number 1347) as by "Link Wray & His Ray Men". "Rumble" was banned in New York and Boston for fear that it would incite teenage gang violence, "rumble" being slang for a gang fight.

Before, during, and after his stints with major labels Epic and Swan, Wray released 45s under many names. Tiring of the corporate music machine, he began recording albums using a three-track studio he converted from an outbuilding on his brother's property that his father used to raise chickens, in Accokeek, Maryland. He wrote and recorded the eponymously-titled LP Link Wray (1971), on which he wrote about his frustrations. The Neville Brothers have recorded two tracks from it, "Fallin' Rain" and "Fire and Brimstone".

While living in the San Francisco Bay Area in the early 1970s, Wray was introduced to Quicksilver Messenger Service guitarist John Cipollina by bassist James "Hutch" Hutchinson. He subsequently formed a band initially featuring special guest Cipollina along with the rhythm section from Cipollina's band Copperhead, bassist Hutch Hutchinson, and drummer David Weber. They opened for the band Lighthouse at the Whisky a Go Go in Los Angeles from May 15–19, 1974. He later did numerous concerts and radio broadcasts in the Bay Area, including at KSAN and at promoter Bill Graham's Winterland Ballroom venue, with Les Lizama later replacing Hutchinson on bass. He toured and recorded two albums with retro-rockabilly artist Robert Gordon in the late 1970s. The 1980s to the present day saw a large number of reissues as well as new material. One member of his band in the 1980s, session drummer Anton Fig, later became drummer in the CBS Orchestra on the Late Show with David Letterman. In 1994, he played on four songs of the album Chatterton by French rocker Alain Bashung.  He went on to release two albums of new music: Shadowman (1997) and Barbed Wire (2000).

In November 2017, Easy Eye Records announced the future release of two recently discovered recordings, "Son of Rumble", presumably a follow-up to 1958's "Rumble", and "Whole Lotta Talking", recorded in 1970. The recordings were issued as a 45rpm single in April 2018.
Easy Eye released another 45rpm single of newly discovered/unreleased material for RSD 2019, "Vernon's Diamond" b/w "My Brother, My Son". "Vernon's Diamond" was recorded circa 1958-59 and is an early version of "Ace of Spades", and "My Brother, My Son" was recorded at the same sessions as "Whole Lotta Talking" in 1970.

Personal life and death

Wray's first three marriages, to Elizabeth Canady Wray, Ethel Tidwell Wray, and Sharon Cole Wray, produced eight children. In the early 1980s, Wray relocated to Denmark and married Olive Povlsen, who became his manager.

Wray died of heart failure at his home in Copenhagen, on November 5, 2005, at the age of 76. Survivors included his nine children, 24 grandchildren, and two great-grandchildren. Wray was cremated, and his ashes were buried in the crypt of the Christian's Church, Copenhagen.

Musical style and influence 

Link Wray's 1950s recordings "straddled country and rockabilly". He later performed surf influenced garage rock in the 1960s, swamp rock and country rock in the early 1970s and hard rock in the late 1970s and onward.

Wray is credited with inventing the power chord. According to AllMusic's Cub Koda, Wray's instrumental recordings starting with "Rumble" through his Swan singles in the early 1960s laid the blueprints for "heavy metal, thrash, you name it." "Rumble" facilitated the emergence of "punk and heavy rock", according to Jeremy Simmonds.

Wray has influenced a wide range of artists. Jimmy Page described Link Wray as having a "real rebel attitude" and credited Wray in the documentary It Might Get Loud as a major influence in his early career. According to Rolling Stone, Pete Townshend of The Who once said, "If it hadn't been for Link Wray and 'Rumble,' I never would have picked up a guitar." Mark E. Smith of The Fall wrote in his autobiography: "The only people I ever really looked up to were Link Wray and Iggy Pop... Guys like [Wray] are very special to me." Iggy Pop and Neil Young have also cited Wray as an influence on their work.
 
Bob Dylan refers to Wray in his song "Sign Language", which he recorded as a duet with Eric Clapton in 1975: "Link Wray was playin' on a juke box I was payin'/ for the words I was saying, so misunderstood/he didn't do me no good" Both Dylan and Bruce Springsteen performed Wray's tune "Rumble" in concert as a tribute to the influential musician upon his 2005 death.  In 2007, musician Steven Van Zandt inducted Link Wray into the Native American Music Hall of Fame with a tribute performance by his grandson Chris Webb and Native artist Gary Small.

Discography

Singles

Wray was a featured collaborator on Robert Gordon's 1977 single "Red Hot" (Private Stock 45-156). The single peaked at No. 83 on the Billboard Hot 100 chart.

Albums

Compilations

With Robert Gordon

See also
Surf music

References

External links

Rumble: The Indians Who Rocked the World
Link Wray's entry at the Rockabilly Hall of Fame 
Perfect Sound Forever: Be Wild, Not Evil: The Link Wray Story
Mr. Guitar's City After Dark: Link Wray Obituary
Vernon Wray – features some unreleased Link photos

1929 births
2005 deaths
20th-century American guitarists
20th-century American male musicians
American expatriates in Denmark
American country rock musicians
American hard rock musicians
American emigrants to Denmark
American male guitarists
American people who self-identify as being of Native American descent
American rockabilly guitarists
Apex Records artists
Burials at Christian's Church, Copenhagen
Cadence Records artists
Garage rock musicians
Guitarists from North Carolina
Norton Records artists
Okeh Records artists
People from Dunn, North Carolina
Protopunk musicians
Swamp rock musicians
Swan Records artists
United States Army personnel of the Korean War
United States Army soldiers